Shimshon "Shimi" Tavori (born February 9, 1953) is an Israeli singer. He performs mostly in Hebrew but also in French.

Biography
Shimshon Tawili was born in Ness Ziona, Israel, to a Yemenite-Jewish family. He was the youngest of seven children.

He met his wife Jennifer Joslyn while performing in New York City in 1982, and married her after a short acquaintance. She then moved to Israel to live with him. They had three sons, Eliran, Ariel, and Daniel. One of his songs, Eliran, is named for his firstborn son. After divorcing Joslyn, Tavori married a 17-year-old Israeli model, Aviva Azulai, with whom he had two children, son Ben El Tavori and daughter Bat-El Tavori. Tavori later divorced Azulai and married Osnat Lorber. They had two children, Orel and Elad, before divorcing. After their divorce, Tavori married and later divorced Sylvia Ziv, a resident of Los Angeles with whom he had a long distance relationship. He later entered a relationship with Yehudit Bauman, who claims to be the daughter of Italian actor Marcello Mastroianni through a brief holiday romance with her mother. Tavori married her in 2016. He is rumored to be the father of Bauman's daughter, Karin, who is a model.

Several of Tavori's children are also involved in the music world. His son Daniel was a contestant on Kokhav Nolad, and has also performed as a drummer, participating in one of Tavori's singles. His son Eliran works with him in concerts and is a music producer. His son Ben El Tavori is a prominent Israeli singer, and part of a famous musical duo with the singer Liraz Russo, known as "Static".

In 1983, he won 145,000 shekels in the Toto lottery.

Singing career

Tavori started out singing at nightclubs in Ramla, among them Calipso and Karish. After his service in the Israel Defense Forces, he recorded his first song, Helena, which was coldly received at first but later became a hit. His first major break came after David Halfon heard him perform a song that Halfon had written for another singer. Halfon introduced Tavori to Uzi Hitman in his early days as a songwriter.

In 1976, the collaboration with Hitman led to Tavori's first record, Chipasti Shirim La'Tzet La'Olam ("I searched for songs to go out to the world"), including his first hit, Eyn Lee Ahavah ("I have no love"), written by Eliezer Rabin. After the records release, Tavori was awarded first place in the Middle Eastern Singing Festival with his song Shechora Ve'Nava" ("Black & Beautiful"). The following year Tavori placed second at the same festival with his song Kinor David, and in 1979 he once more placed first with the song Moshe, written for him by singer-songwriter Avihu Medina.

Collaboration with Medina produced numbers like Shabhi Yerushalayim and Al Tashliheini Le'et Zikna, which became megahits for Tavori and other Mizrahi singers in Israel.

In 1982 Tavori turned down an offer to enter the festival again with the song written for him by Medina, Haperch Be'Gani (which ended up placing first when performed by Medina's second choice, Zohar Argov, launching his legendary career), choosing instead to go perform in New York City. In 1993 Tavori entered the Eurovision Song Contest with the song Chai Et Ma'She Yesh ("I Live With What I've Got").
Known also with the ballad "Remember" in the 80's (Big hit in Greece 1985-1986).
In 2000, he released a triple album in French "Oriental Tempo" with international contributions of Turkish folk singer İbrahim Tatlıses, French entertainer Francky Perez, and Israeli musician and singer Meir Banai.

In 2009, he finished second on the TV show HaAch HaGadol (VIP Big Brother).

In 2021, Tavori participated in the fourth season of The X Factor Israel, in the goal of representing Israel in the Eurovision Song Contest 2022. He was eliminated in the chairs round.

See also
 Music of Israel

References

External links
Official website

1953 births
20th-century Israeli male singers
Israeli people of Yemeni-Jewish descent
Living people
People from Ness Ziona
Israeli Mizrahi Jews
Big Brother (franchise) contestants
The X Factor contestants